Syed Hussain Jahania Gardezi is a Pakistani politician who was the Provincial Minister of Punjab for Agriculture, in office from 13 September 2019 till April 2022. He had been a member of the Provincial Assembly of the Punjab from August 2018 till January 2023.

Previously, he was a Member of the Provincial Assembly of the Punjab between 1993 and May 2018.

Early life and education
He was born on 6 November 1956 in Multan.

He has a degree of Master of Science (Hons) which he obtained in 1980 from University of Agriculture Faisalabad. He has received a Diploma (L.G) from Foreign Ministry Institute, Denmark in 1993.

Political career

He ran for the seat of the Provincial Assembly of the Punjab as a candidate of Pakistan Democratic Alliance from Constituency PP-174 (Khanewal-I) in 1990 Pakistani general election but was unsuccessful. He received 19,005 votes and lost the seat to a candidate of Islami Jamhoori Ittehad (IJI).

He was elected to the Provincial Assembly of the Punjab as an independent candidate from Constituency PP-174 (Khanewal-I) in 1993 Pakistani general election. He received 16,191 and defeated a candidate of Pakistan Peoples Party (PPP). During his tenure as member of the Provincial Assembly of the Punjab, he served as Provincial Minister of Punjab for Cooperatives.

He was re-elected to the Provincial Assembly of the Punjab as a candidate of National Alliance from Constituency PP-213 (Khanewal-II) in the 2002 Pakistani general election. He received 26,462 votes and defeated a candidate of Pakistan Muslim League (Q) (PML-Q). In January 2003, he was inducted into the provincial Punjab cabinet of Chief Minister Chaudhry Pervaiz Elahi and was made Provincial Minister of Punjab for Non-formal Urban Education. In 2006, he was made Provincial Minister of Punjab for Food. During his tenure as member of the Provincial Assembly of the Punjab, he also served as Provincial Minister of Punjab for Local Government.

He ran for the seat of the Provincial Assembly of the Punjab as a candidate of PML-Q from Constituency PP-213 (Khanewal-II) in 2008 Pakistani general election but was unsuccessful. He received 22,379 votes and lost the seat to a candidate of PPP.

He was re-elected to the Provincial Assembly of the Punjab as an independent candidate from Constituency PP-213 (Khanewal-II) in 2013 Pakistani general election. He joined Pakistan Muslim League (N) in May 2013.

He was re-elected to Provincial Assembly of the Punjab as an independent candidate from Constituency PP-204 (Khanewal-II) in 2018 Pakistani general election.

On 28 July 2018, he joined Pakistan Tehreek-e-Insaf (PTI).

On 12 September 2018, he was inducted into the provincial Punjab cabinet of Chief Minister Sardar Usman Buzdar. On 13 September 2018, he was appointed as Provincial Minister of Punjab for Management and Professional Development.

As of 16 September 2019, he has been serving as the Provincial Minister for Agriculture in Punjab.

References

Living people
Punjab MPAs 2013–2018
Punjab MPAs 2002–2007
1956 births
Pakistan Muslim League (N) MPAs (Punjab)
Punjab MPAs 1993–1996
Pakistan Tehreek-e-Insaf MPAs (Punjab)
Punjab MPAs 2018–2023
Provincial ministers of Punjab
University of Agriculture, Faisalabad alumni